War Without End is the debut album released by the American thrash metal band Warbringer on February 5, 2008 via Century Media Records.

Track listing 
All songs written by Warbringer.

Japanese bonus track

Notes 
The album was released in red vinyl, which was limited to 1,000 copies and came with an embroidered patch.
"Epicus Maximus" is an instrumental track and begins after a minute of silence. The song itself is 2:02. This song is also known as "A Dead Current", which was later confirmed to be a fan-created name for the song, being "Epicus Maximus" the original name.
A song by the name of "Nightslasher" was included on some editions of the album.

Personnel 
 John Kevill – vocals
 John Laux – guitars
 Adam Carroll – guitars
 Andy Laux – bass
 Ryan Bates – drums

References 

2008 debut albums
Warbringer albums
Century Media Records albums